Miquel Aubà i Fleix (5 June 1965 – 31 January 2022) was a Spanish politician. A member of the Republican Left of Catalonia, he served in the Senate of Spain from 2015 until his death on 31 January 2022, at the age of 56.

References

1965 births
2022 deaths
Mayors of places in Catalonia
Members of the Senate of Spain
People from Terra Alta (comarca)
20th-century Spanish politicians
Republican Left of Catalonia politicians
Members of the 11th Senate of Spain
Members of the 12th Senate of Spain
Members of the 13th Senate of Spain
20th-century Spanish businesspeople